Osterfeuerkopf is a mountain of Bavaria, Germany. It is located close to the Southern German city of Garmisch-Partenkirchen and Germany's tallest peak, the Zugspitze.

In 2010, a German-Spanish expedition climbed to the top of the mountain, marking the first joint-expedition from these two European Union member states.

Mountains of Bavaria
Mountains of the Alps